Leiophora is a genus of flies in the family Tachinidae.

Species
Leiophora innoxia (Meigen, 1824)

Distribution
China, British Isles, Czech Republic, Hungary, Moldova, Poland, Slovakia, Ukraine, Norway, Sweden, Bosnia & Herzegovina, Italy, Serbia, Slovenia, Austria, Belgium, France, Germany, Switzerland, Mongolia, Russia, Transcaucasia.

References

Diptera of Asia
Diptera of Europe
Exoristinae
Tachinidae genera
Taxa named by Johann Wilhelm Meigen